Walter Wanderley  (born Walter Jose Wanderley Mendonça, May 12, 1932 – September 4, 1986) was a Brazilian organist and pianist, best known for his lounge and bossa nova music and for his instrumental version of the song Summer Samba which became a worldwide hit.

Biography
Wanderley was born in Recife, Brazil. Already famous in his native country by the late 1950s, he became an internationally renowned star in the mid-1960s through his collaboration with the singer Astrud Gilberto.

He recorded six albums on the Verve label between 1966 and 1968.  Three of those albums, Rain Forest, Cheganca and Astrud Gilberto's A Certain Smile, A Certain Sadness, were with a trio consisting of Wanderley, Claudio Slon (drums) and Jose Marino (bass) and were produced in the United States by Creed Taylor, who initially brought the trio to the U.S. to record at the persuasion of Tony Bennett. Wanderley's U.S. recording of Summer Samba reached No. 26 on the Billboard charts in the summer of 1966. Another album recorded during that period was Popcorn, in collaboration with the Brazilian singer-guitarist Luiz Henrique Rosa. Around that same period Wanderley also established the Carnival with Bob Matthews, João Palma, José Soares, and Janis Hansen; all former members of Sérgio Mendes' Brasil '66.

After the trio disbanded (though they were briefly reunited in 1971 for "The Return of the Original" on Canyon Records), Wanderley himself continued to record albums on Verve, A&M/CTI, and GNP Crescendo.  During that time, he also made numerous personal appearances, including a concert tour of Mexico.

Wanderley was known for his distinctive staccato stuttering style and mastery of the Hammond B-3 organ and on later recordings and during live concerts an L Series Hammond. His later career was blighted by alcoholism and he died in relative obscurity of cancer in 1986 in San Francisco, California, aged 54.

He is the grandfather of Brazilian actor and singer Rickkie.

Discography

Albums
 1959: Festa Dançante (RGE)
 1960: Eu, Você e Walter Wanderley (Odeon MOFB-3085)
 196?: Feito Sob Medida (Odeon MOFB-3109)
 1961: Sucessos Dançantes Em Ritmo de Romance (Odeon MOFB-3155)
 1961: O Sucesso é Samba (Odeon MOFB-3204)
 1962: Samba é Samba (Odeon MOFB-3248)
 1962: O Samba é Mais Samba (Odeon MOFB-3285)
 1962: E O Bolero (Odeon MOFB-3289)
 1963: Samba No Esquema (Odeon MOFB-3358)
 1963: Walter Wanderley’s Brazilian Organ (Capitol ST-1856)
 1964: Entre Nós (Philips P 632.197 L)
 1964: Órgão Sax Sexy (Philips P 632.721 L)
 1964: O Toque Inconfundivel (Philips P 632.726 L)
 1965: Quarteto Bossamba (Som Maior)
 1965: O Autêntico Walter Wanderley (Philips P 632.757 L)
 1965: Samba So (Fermata)
 1966: Sucessos + Boleros (Philips P.632.894 L)
 1966: Rain Forest (Verve V6-8658)
 1966: A Certain Smile, a Certain Sadness (with Astrud Gilberto, Verve V6-8673)
 1966: Chegança (Verve V6-8676)
 1967: Brazilian Blend (Philips PHM 600–227)
 1967: Organ-ized (Philips – PHM 200–233)
 1967: Batucada (Verve V6-8706)
 1967: Popcorn (Verve V6-8734)
 1967: Murmúrio (Tower ST 5058)
 1967: Kee-Ka-Roo (Verve V6-8739)
 1968: When It Was Done (A&M Records, CTI Records SP-3018)
 1969: Moondreams (A&M Records, CTI Records SP-3022)
 1971: The Return of the Original  (Beverly #SULP 19004)
 1980: Brazil's Greatest Hits! (GNP Crescendo)
 1981: Perpetual Motion Love''  (GNP Crescendo #GNPD 2142)

Singles
"Summer Samba (So Nice)" US No. 26, 1966
"On the South Side of Chicago" (1967) Did Not Chart

References

External links 
 The Walter Wanderley Pictorial Discography
 AOL biography page

Brazilian jazz organists
Brazilian jazz pianists
Brazilian jazz composers
Bossa nova organists
Lounge music organists
Bossa nova pianists
Lounge music pianists
Brazilian people of Dutch descent
Capitol Records artists
Verve Records artists
1932 births
1986 deaths
Deaths from cancer in California
20th-century pianists
20th-century organists
20th-century jazz composers
CTI Records artists